Old American Golf Club is an 18-hole semi-private golf club in the southern United States, located in The Colony, Texas, a suburb north of Dallas. Along Lewisville Lake in Denton County, the course opened for play in 2010, designed by Tripp Davis and tour professional

Tour events
Old American is scheduled to host its first LPGA Tour event, the Volunteers of America LPGA Texas Classic,   The tournament was previously held in Irving at Las Colinas Country Club.

Course
Back (Leonard) tees

References

External links

Golf clubs and courses in Texas
2010 establishments in Texas